Huis Bergh is a castle in 's-Heerenberg and is one of the largest castles in the Netherlands. It gives its name to the Land van den Bergh and was previously owned by the counts van Bergh.

Nowadays, it is a famous tourist attraction for its beautiful appearance and late-medieval art collection.

History
The building history dates back to the 13th century. The main parts of the castle are from the 14th, 15th and 17th century. In the beginning of the Dutch Revolt the house got damaged by war. In 1735 the castle burned down. 
In 1912 Huis Bergh and all belongings became the property of Jan Herman van Heek, an industrialist from Enschede. He restored the buildings. In 1939 there was another major fire. Thanks to the help of locals most of the furniture was rescued. Renovation began the same year and was completed in 1941.

Art collection
Huis Bergh contains a collection of early Italian paintings, one famous example of which is a panel from the Maestà of Duccio, which was added to the castle's collection in the 19th century.  In addition to a portrait of Erasmus by Holbein Huis Bergh has an extraordinary collection of medieval handwritings.

See also
List of castles in the Netherlands

References 

Kransber, D. & H. Mils, Kastelengids van Nederland, middeleeuwen, Bussem 1979
Kalkwiek, K.A., A.I.J.M. Schellart, H.P.H. Jansen & P.W. Geudeke, Atlas van de Nederlandse kastelen, Alphen aan den Rijn 1980
Helsdingen, H.W. van, Gids voor de Nederlandse kastelen en buitenplaatsen, Amsterdam 1966
Tromp, H.M.J., Kijk op kastelen Amsterdam 1979

External links 
 Website Kasteel Huis Bergh
 Collectie op IGEM (Internet Gelderse Musea)

Bergh
Castles in Gelderland
Museums in Gelderland
Rijksmonuments in Gelderland
Montferland